Mauro Mendonça (born April 2, 1931) is a Brazilian actor. Born in Ubá, he started his career in 1955 in the Teatro Brasileiro de Comédia. He debuted in the 1963 TV Excelsior telenovela Corações em Conflito. He went on to act on Rede Record and TV Tupi before moving to Rede Globo in 1973, where he continues to practice acting.

He has been married to actress Rosamaria Murtinho since 1959, and has three children: director Mauro Mendonça Filho, actor Rodrigo Mendonça, and musical producer João Paulo Mendonça. He also has five grandchildren: Vitória, Anna, Pedro, Sofia and Januária.

Selected filmography

 Carnaval em Caxias (1954)
 O Petróleo é Nosso (1954)
 Rio, 100 Degrees F. (1955) as Italian tourist at the Sugar Loaf
 Dona Violante Miranda (1960) as Firmino
 Seara Vermelha (1964)
 A Muralha (1968–1969, TV Series) as Dom Braz Olinto
 O Descarte (1973) as Aguiar
 Maria... Sempre Maria (1973)
 Dona Flor and Her Two Husbands (1976) as Dr. Teodoro Madureira
 Estúpido Cupido (1976–1977, TV Series) as Armando Siqueira
 Nos Embalos de Ipanema (1978) as Patrícia's father
 Love Strange Love (1982) as Dr. Benicio / politician
 Doce Delírio (1983) as Armando
 Natal da Portela
 Kuarup (1989) as Gouveia, minister
 A Grande Arte (1991) as Policeman
 Sonho Meu (1993–1994, TV Series) as Carlos
 Anjo Mau (1997–1998) as Rui Novaes
 Meu Bem Querer (1998–1999) as Bilac Maciel
 A Muralha (2000, TV Mini-Series) as Dom Braz Olinto
 O Quinto dos Infernos (2002, TV Mini-Series) as Archbishop Melo
 Benjamim (2003) as Dr. Campoceleste
 Didi, o Cupido Trapalhão (2003) as Dr. Poleto
 Cabocla (2004, TV Series) as Coronel Justino
 Redeemer (2004) as Noronha
 O Profeta (2006–2007, TV Series) as Francisco
 A Favorita (2008–2009, TV Series) as Gonçalo Fontini
 Ti Ti Ti (2010–2011, TV Series) as Giancarlo Villa
 O Astro (2011, TV Series)
 Gabriela (2012, TV Series) as Manoel das Onças
 Êta Mundo Bom! (2016, TV Series) as Dr. Inácio Xavier
 Tô Ryca! (2016) as Odair

References

External links

1931 births
20th-century Brazilian male actors
21st-century Brazilian male actors
Brazilian male film actors
Brazilian male stage actors
Brazilian male television actors
Living people
People from Ubá